Sutton Coldfield power station supplied electricity to the town of Sutton Coldfield, Birmingham (then part of Warwickshire) from 1901 to 1959. The electricity generating station was owned and operated by Sutton Coldfield Corporation prior to the nationalisation of the British electricity industry in 1948. It was closed in 1959 when it had a generating capacity of 1.0 MW.

History
In 1899 Sutton Coldfield Corporation applied for a Provisional Order under the Electric Lighting Acts to generate and supply electricity to the town. This was granted by the Board of Trade and was confirmed by Parliament through the Electric Lighting Orders Confirmation (No. 1) Act 1899 (62 & 63 Vict. c. xxxiv). The Corporation bought for £650 the old gas works site, at the intersection of Coleshill Road and Riland Road, Sutton Coldfield (52°33'46"N 1°48'58"W), and built a power station which first supplied electricity to the town in 1901. The initial system had a generating capacity of 350 kW and supplied 12 arc lights and 108 incandescent bulbs and was capable of supplying 10,000 private lamps.

Sutton Coldfield Corporation owned the power station and electricity supply system until nationalisation of the British electricity industry in 1948. Under nationalisation the Sutton Coldfield electricity undertaking was abolished, ownership of the power station was vested in the British Electricity Authority, and subsequently the Central Electricity Authority and the Central Electricity Generating Board (CEGB). At the same time the electricity distribution and sales responsibilities of the Sutton Coldfield electricity undertaking were transferred to the Midlands Electricity Board (MEB).

The power station continued to operate for a decade after nationalisation until it was closed in 1959.

Technical specification
By 1923 the generating plant comprised:

 Coal-fired boilers supplying 24,000 lb/h (3.02 kg/s) of steam to:
 Generators:
 1 × 150 kW reciprocating engines and direct current generator sets
 1 × 275kW reciprocating engine and DC generator sets
 1 × 450 kW reciprocating engine and DC generator set

These machines had a total generating capacity of 875 kW.

Electricity supplies were available to consumers at 480 and 240 Volts DC

Operations
The end use of electricity over the period 1921–23 was:

The operating parameters of the electricity system were:

Revenue from sales of current was £19,610 (1922) and £19,977 (1923). The surplus of revenue over expenses £6,467 (1922) and £9,401 (1923).

In 1946 the station generated 3,277 MWh, an adjacent waste destructor generated 228 MWh. The combined output from both stations was 3451MWh. The maximum load sent out that year was 1071 MW, and the load factor was 39.5 per cent.

The power station building still exists and has been redeveloped with commercial premises.

See also
 Timeline of the UK electricity supply industry
 List of power stations in England

References

Coal-fired power stations in England
Demolished power stations in the United Kingdom
Former power stations in England
Sutton Coldfield